Locust Music was a Chicago-based independent record label founded in 2001.

See also
 List of record labels

Record labels established in 2001
American independent record labels
Companies based in Chicago